Glyphostomoides queenslandica is a species of sea snail, a marine gastropod mollusk in the family Raphitomidae.

Distribution
This marine species occurs off Queensland, Australia

References

 Shuto, T. 1983. New turrid taxa from the Australian waters. Memoirs of the Faculty of Sciences of Kyushu University, Series D, Geology 25: 1-26

External links
 

queenslandica
Gastropods described in 1983
Gastropods of Australia